István Schweitzer (1887–1981) was a Hungarian military officer, who served as commander of the Hungarian First Army during the Second World War.

References
 Magyar Életrajzi Lexikon
 The Generals of WWII

Hungarian soldiers
Hungarian military personnel of World War II
1887 births
1981 deaths